Karl-Heinz Rosch (3 October 1926  6 October 1944) was a German soldier during World War II who saved the lives of two Dutch children.

Background and Rescue
Rosch was an eighteen-year-old German soldier and along with his platoon, was stationed in a farm in Goirle when Allied forces opened fire on them. Rosch noticed that the two children of the farmer who owned the land seemed oblivious of the danger around them and continued to play in the courtyard. He ran to them, took each in his arms and brought them into the safety of the basement. He again ran outside to position himself on the other side of the courtyard when a grenade hit him right at the spot where the children were earlier. Rosch was killed instantly.

Aftermath
Because Rosch was a German soldier, and the enemy, his story was kept private after the war. His story was not brought public until 2008. Public funding for a statue was rejected, however funds were raised to create a statue as a memorial. On November 4, 2008 a bronze statue was erected on a private property in Goirle in memory of Karl-Heinz Rosch. The statue is considered to be the only monument in the world to a German World War II soldier who was part of an occupying force.

See also 
Friedrich Lengfeld

References 

1926 births
1944 deaths
German Army personnel killed in World War II
German Army soldiers of World War II
Deaths by hand grenade
People from Meissen
Military personnel from Saxony